Ramiro Martinez may refer to:
Ramiro Martinez (police officer) (born 1937), American police officer
Ramiro Martínez (rugby union) (born 1970), Argentine-born Italian rugby union player
Ramiro Martinez (sportscaster) (1923–2015), Cuban sportscaster
Ramiro Martinez, Jr. (born 1962), American criminologist